Francisco Ramón Dorronsoro Sánchez (born 22 May 1985 in Torrelavega, Cantabria) is a Spanish footballer who plays for CF Badalona as a goalkeeper.

References

External links

1985 births
Living people
People from Torrelavega
Spanish footballers
Footballers from Cantabria
Association football goalkeepers
Segunda División players
Segunda División B players
Tercera División players
CD Universidad de Zaragoza players
Real Zaragoza B players
CD Alcoyano footballers
AD Alcorcón footballers
Albacete Balompié players
Lorca FC players
CF Badalona players
Indian Super League players
Odisha FC players
Spanish expatriate footballers
Expatriate footballers in India
Spanish expatriate sportspeople in India